Evan C. Kim (born February 17, 1953) is an American actor. He is best known for playing Harry Callahan's partner Inspector Al Quan in the fifth, and final, "Dirty Harry" film The Dead Pool (1988).

Early and personal life
Kim was born in New Jersey to immigrant parents from Korea. He developed passions for martial arts (tae kwon do) and writing when he was young; Kim recalled he "was one of your typical small, slow-to-grow kids. I was getting beat up, fairly often, and also ignored in school, so I found I needed to channel my feelings of revenge and hurt into something constructive ... useful for myself and others. Tae kwon do worked for becoming physically respected, and writing proved the means for periodically emptying the vessel."

Career and roles
He also played Loo in the comedy The Kentucky Fried Movie (1977) (in the segment "A Fistful of Yen"), the interpreter Cowboy in the Vietnam War film Go Tell the Spartans (1978), the erudite caveman Nook in the cult comedy Caveman (1981), Suki in the B movie Megaforce (1982), and Tony in the miniseries V (1983). His other film roles include the film Hollywood Vice Squad (1986), the film Thousand Pieces of Gold (1991), and the film Loving Lulu, a year later.

Kim was a series regular in the short-lived Khan! (1975), as the college-educated son of the titular character (played by Khigh Dhiegh), helping his father solve crimes alongside his sister (played by Irene Yah-Ling Sun). His television guest appearances include Kung Fu, CHiPs, Police Story, The Secrets of Isis, C.P.O. Sharkey, Fantasy Island, Serpico, Knight Rider, Sword of Justice, Matt Houston, Knots Landing, Max Headroom, Matlock and Alien Nation. Kim also directed an episode of Alien Nation.

Filmography

References

External links
 

1953 births
Living people
American male film actors
American male television actors
American male screenwriters
American male actors of Korean descent
20th-century American male actors
21st-century American male actors
Male actors from New Jersey